National Route 38 is a national highway in South Korea connects Seosan to Donghae. It established on 31 August 1971.

Main stopovers
South Chungcheong Province
 Seosan - Dangjin - Asan 
Gyeonggi Province
 Pyeongtaek - Anseong - Icheon
North Chungcheong Province
 Eumseong - Chungju - Jecheon
Gangwon Province
 Yeongwol - Jeongseon - Taebaek - Samcheok - Donghae

Major intersections 

 (■): Expressway 
IS: Intersection, IC: Interchange

South Chungcheong Province

Gyeonggi Province 

  Expressway
 Nearby Oseong IC

North Chungcheong Province 

  Expressway

Gangwon Province 

  Expressway

References

38
Roads in South Chungcheong
Roads in Gyeonggi
Roads in North Chungcheong
Roads in Gangwon